= Hussey Commission =

Catholic Church child sexual abuse commission

The Hussey Commission, also known as the Catholic Church Commission on Child Sexual Abuse, was established in June 2002 by the Bishops' Conference and the Conference of Religious in Ireland to examine what was known by Roman Catholic bishops about complaints of child sexual abuse by priests and religious in Ireland.

The commission was chaired by retired judge Gillian Hussey. It stood down in December 2002 on the news that the Irish government was setting up a more comprehensive and perhaps independent system of inquiries. The cost of the commission's work in six months totalled €306,000.
